Izak Rankine (born 23 April 2000) is a professional Australian rules footballer who plays for the Adelaide Football Club in the Australian Football League (AFL), having previously been drafted to the Gold Coast Suns with pick 3 in the 2018 AFL draft.

Early life
Rankine was born in Adelaide into a family of Indigenous Australian descent (Kokatha and Ngarrindjeri). He shares a relation to Australian Football Hall of Fame inductee and 1993 Brownlow Medalist Gavin Wanganeen as well as being the first cousin of former AFL player Danyle Pearce. As a child, Rankine played an array of sports which included basketball, rugby and tennis but eventually chose to focus on Australian rules football. He grew up playing junior football for Edwardstown and Flinders Park before being given the opportunity to rise through the junior ranks at SANFL club West Adelaide.

In 2016, he played his first senior SANFL game for West Adelaide at the age of 16 and kicked two goals on debut. He was later selected to represent South Australia in the 2017 and 2018 AFL Under 18 Championships where he was named in the All-Australian team both years and played a crucial role in South Australia's 2018 national championship. Rankine attended Henley High School throughout his teenage years, where he played school football alongside future Gold Coast teammate Jack Lukosius and the pair were very influential in winning the 2018 SA Schools Championship.

AFL career
Rankine was drafted by the Gold Coast Suns with the third pick in the 2018 AFL draft. Persistent hamstring and hip injuries prevented him from making his AFL debut in 2019 but the Suns showed faith in Rankine by agreeing to a two-year contract extension which tied him to the club until the end of 2022. Rankine made his AFL debut against the Melbourne Demons in round 6 of the 2020 AFL season and impressed with a three-goal performance, which earned him the round 6 AFL Rising Star nomination.

Personal life
In his spare time, Rankine enjoys making music. His cousin is in a relationship with Gold Coast teammate Sean Lemmens and the couple's daughter is Rankine's second niece.

Statistics
 Statistics are correct to the end of round 3, 2022

|-
! scope="row" style="text-align:center" | 2020
|
| 22 || 12 || 12 || 17 || 90 || 48 || 138 || 26 || 21 || 1.0 || 1.4 || 7.5 || 4.0 || 11.5 || 2.2 || 1.8 || 1
|- style="background-color: #EAEAEA"
! scope="row" style="text-align:center" | 2021
|
| 22 || 18 || 16 || 11 || 120 || 92 || 212 || 51 || 46 || 0.9 || 0.6 || 6.7 || 5.1 || 11.8 || 2.8 || 2.6 || 0
|-
! scope="row" style="text-align:center" | 2022
|
| 22 || 1 || 4 || 1 || 18 || 5 || 23 || 6 || 1 || 4.0 || 1.0 || 18.0 || 5.0 || 23.0 || 6.0 || 1.0 || TBA
|- class="sortbottom"
! colspan=3| Career
! 31
! 32
! 29
! 228
! 145
! 373
! 83
! 68
! 1.0
! 0.9
! 7.4
! 4.7
! 12.0
! 2.7
! 2.2
! 1
|}

References

External links

2000 births
Living people
Indigenous Australian players of Australian rules football
Australian rules footballers from South Australia
Gold Coast Football Club players
Ngarrindjeri people